Matthias Bachinger and Dominik Meffert are the defending champions, but chose not to participate.

Dustin Brown and Rameez Junaid won the tournament, defeating Wesley Koolhof and Matwé Middelkoop in the final.

Seeds

Draw

References
 Main Draw

Maserati Challenger - Doubles
2015 Doubles